Mr. Hands is the twenty-fourth album by Herbie Hancock. Unlike the preceding album, 'Monster', which was conceptualized as a dance album, 'Mr. Hands' is a collection of different musical styles with distinct groups. It features bass guitarist Jaco Pastorius on the track "4 A.M.," plus multiple guests including Bennie Maupin, Sheila E. and Ron Carter, plus an all-synthesizer track ("Textures") performed entirely by Hancock. "Shiftless Shuffle" (originally released on the 1979 Japan-only album Directstep) was recorded by the members of The Headhunters quintet in 1973 during the sessions for the album Head Hunters.  This album was the first on which Hancock used a computer, this time an Apple II.  He would continue his relationship with Apple Computer for many years.

Overlooked when it was originally released, this was Hancock's last outing of "straight" electric jazz for some time, as he began to focus more on his R&B influences.

Track listing
All songs composed by Herbie Hancock.

Personnel
 Herbie Hancock - synthesizer, acoustic piano, electric piano, keyboards, vocals (through vocoder), clavinet, Minimoog, ARP 2600, Apple II, Linn LM-1 drum computer
 Bennie Maupin - tenor saxophone (5)
 Wah Wah Watson - guitar (3)
 Byron Miller (1), Ron Carter (2), Freddie Washington (3), Jaco Pastorius (4), Paul Jackson (5) - bass
 Leon Chancler (1), Tony Williams (2), Alphonse Mouzon (3), Harvey Mason (4,5) - drums
 Bill Summers (1, 4-5), Sheila Escovedo (2-3) - percussion

References

1980 albums
Herbie Hancock albums
Albums produced by Dave Rubinson
Columbia Records albums